Nesthäkchen und ihre Küken (English:Nesthäkchen and Her Chicks) is the seventh volume of the ten-book Nesthäkchen series by Else Ury. This volume was published in 1923. Nesthäkchen is Annemarie Braun, a Berlin doctor's daughter, a slim, golden blond, quintessential German girl.  The series follows Annemarie from infancy (Nesthäkchen and Her Dolls) to old age and grandchildren (Nesthäkchen with White Hair). Nesthäkchen und ihre Küken describes Anne Marie's early years of motherhood.

Plot summary
In this novel the plot has advanced beyond the year during which Else Ury was writing, 1923. Strictly speaking, Ury is describing the future. Annemarie Braun was born 9 April 1903, and married at 20; she could thus in 1930 be celebrating her seventh wedding anniversary, which occurs in the book.
In order to continue the series, Else Ury extended the middle 1920s milieu of her fifth and sixth Nesthäkchen volumes for another half-century. Time stands still, but the characters age. Therefore, Annemarie’s life no longer unfolds, as in the first six books, in an actual historical period.
"Nesthäkchen and Her Chicks" begins with Anne Marie and Rudolf's seventh wedding anniversary. The two now have three children, the six-year Vronli, the three-year-old Hans and two-year-old Ursel, and live in Berlin-Lichterfelde. Anne Marie's parents, "Omama" and "Opapa" are now beloved grandparents, her grandmother the "Urmütterchen" and Aunt Albertina the "Urtantchen" of Annemarie’s children. Brother Hans is a magistrate married to Rudolf's sister Ola, with two sons, Herbert and Waldemar. Klaus is a farmer, still a bachelor, who is enamored of Annemarie’s girlfriend Ilse Hermann. Ilse and Marlene Ulrich, the inseparable cousins, are teachers at a girls' school. Margot and Vera are unmarried and employed, Margot as head of a dressmaking firm and Vera as a photographer.
Anne Marie's daughter Vronli starts school. On this day the children Hans and Ursel are alone in the house and find Father’s matches. Hans starts a fire. The house burns down and the homeless family finds shelter with their neighbors, the lonely, old, but child-loving bachelor Mr. Pfefferkorn and his grumpy housekeeper Mrs. Luebke. Subsequently Annemarie and the children move in with her parents. Financial worries torment Annemarie and Rudolf, and Annemarie has the desire to earn money to help her husband. She is unable to carry out this plan. (Else Ury is alluding to the economic misery caused by the Hyperinflation in the Weimar Republic  between June 1921 and January 1924.) In winter the children become seriously ill with the flu, but recover.
"Urmütterchens" seventieth birthday is celebrated (the author has apparently overlooked the fact that grandmother has already celebrated her seventieth birthday in volume 3). "Urtantchen" dies soon afterward. In summer, Annemarie travels with her children, Ilse and Marlene, to visit her brother Klaus in the Pomeranian countryside. They live at his estate, Lüttgenheide, on the Baltic Sea, nearby Cousin Peter on Grotgenheide. The story ends with the betrothal of Klaus to Ilse and Peter to Marlene.
In the first editions of the book, Else Ury adds an epilogue in which she states that she hesitated to continue the Nesthäkchen series, but was finally moved to do so by the many letters of her young readers.
This volume was modernized after World War II. Originally Annemarie sometimes spanks her children, but does not do so in the post-war editions.

Genre

The Nesthäkchen books represent a German literary genre, the Backfischroman, a girls' novel that describes maturation and was intended for readers 12 – 16 years old. A Backfisch (“teenage girl”, literally “fish for frying”) is a young girl between fourteen and seventeen years of age. The Backfischroman was in fashion between 1850 and 1950. It dealt overwhelmingly with stereotypes, traditional social images of growing girls absorbing societal norms. The stories ended in marriage, with the heroine becoming a Hausfrau. Among the most successful Backfischroman authors, beside Else Ury, were Magda Trott, Emmy von Rhoden with her Der Trotzkopf and Henny Koch. Ury intended to end the Nesthäkchen series with volume 6, Nesthäkchen Flies From the Nest, describing Nesthäkchen's marriage. Meidingers Jugendschriften Verlag, her Berlin publisher, was inundated with a flood of letters from Ury's young fans, begging for more Nesthäkchen stories. After some hesitation, Ury wrote four more Nesthäkchen volumes, and included comments about her initial doubts in an epilogue to volume 7, Nesthäkchen and Her Chicks.

Author
Else Ury (November 1, 1877 in Berlin; January 13, 1943 in the Auschwitz concentration camp) was a German writer and children's book author. Her best-known character is the blonde doctor's daughter Annemarie Braun, whose life from childhood to old age is told in the ten volumes of the highly successful Nesthäkchen series. The books, the six-part TV series Nesthäkchen (1983), based on the first three volumes, as well as the new DVD edition (2005) caught the attention of millions of readers and viewers.

References

1923 German-language novels
1923 German novels
1923 children's books
German children's novels
Child characters in literature
Fictional German people